Communications in Korea may refer to:
Communications in North Korea
Communications in South Korea